The Boys' 400 metres hurdles at the 2013 World Youth Championships in Athletics was held  on 10–12 July.

Medalists

Records 
Prior to the competition, the following records were as follows.

Heats 
Qualification rule: first 3 of each heat (Q) and the next 3 fastest (q) qualified.

Heat 1

Heat 2

Heat 3

Heat 4

Heat 5

Heat 6

Heat 7

Semifinals 
Qualification rule: first 2 of each heat (Q) plus the 2 fastest times (q) qualified.

Heat 1

Heat 2

Heat 3

Final

References 

2013 World Youth Championships in Athletics